Phaeoxantha klugii is a species of tiger beetle in the subfamily Cicindelinae that was described by Maximilien Chaudoir in 1850.

References

Beetles described in 1850
Beetles of South America